Qasr El Nil Street is a street in downtown Cairo, Egypt, one of the biggest streets in Cairo, with many businesses, restaurants, and an active nightlife.

The vintage urban planning and architecture here are reminiscent of the illustrious period of late 19th and early 20th century European Beaux-Arts and Egyptian—Islamic—Moorish Revival styles. The street and its new building designs were part of creating a new international downtown district, to link to Egypt's rich Islamic heritage and institutions with the many new foreign enterprises, at the turn of the 20th century in Cairo.

Geography
Qasr El Nil Street extends (east to west): from the Abdeen Palace at Abdeen Square, passes a vibrant business district, Bab El-Lauq Market, and the American University in Cairo—Downtown Campus, is joined by Talaat Harb Street and passes through Tahrir Square with The Mogamma building and Egyptian Antiquities Museum, and then crosses the Nile River on the Qasr El Nil Bridge, to end on Gezira Island.

History

Isma'il Pasha and Ismailiya era

Isma'il Pasha, the ruler of Egypt, decided to strategically reclaim the East Bank of the Nile opposite Gezira Island, and create a 'Paris on the Nile.' The lower area was part of the Nile's natural pond, marsh, wetland, and riparian zone habitats for millennia, making this an ambitious civil engineering project. The existing 1880s Khairy Pasha palace was higher in the eastern Tahrir Square area, and later was absorbed into the American University in Cairo downtown campus. This urban project's starting point was building the Egyptian Army Barracks, which became an important Egyptian and later British government institution. After adequate civic infrastructure was completed in 1874, Ismail Pasha decided that buildings had to cost a minimum 2000 L.E. amount of money to build and furnish. The large sum for the time was intended to ensure that the buildings in the Ismailiya district would be significant, large and built with expensive materials, and therefore excluding small shops and houses. Throughout its early years the street attracted many of the Egyptian elites, socialites, celebrities, and businesspeople, who caused a commercialization and development movement from the street beyond into the district that was rising to become classic downtown Cairo.

British and independence eras
When the British arrived to oversee Egypt in 1882, their first decision was to occupy the Egyptian Army Barracks on the Nile. Khedive Tawfiq disbanded the Egyptian Army five days later to humiliate the Egyptian officers who demonstrated against their own army. After many years of British occupation, King Farouk reclaimed the Barracks structures in 1948, but relocated the new Egyptian Army Barracks east to the Abbassia district.  The site of the Egyptian Army Barracks was first then converted into a municipality building of Cairo (later the Nile Hilton site), changing central Qasr El Nil Street from a military to civilian character thereafter. The adjacent Midan Ismailiyya square, later renamed as Tahrir Square—Liberation Square, was expanded after some of the British barracks demolition 'liberated' space for Cairenes.

Architecture

  

Qasr El Nil Street's original architecture is reminiscent of European Beaux-Arts, Neo-Baroque, Art Nouveau, and Modernisme, and Art Deco architectural influences, with some Egyptian, Islamic, and Moorish Revival architectural styles, and recent modernist buildings as well.

Landmarks
Some of the landmarks on or near Qasr El Nil Street, from east to west, include:
Abdeen Palace
The Abdeen Palace was built by Khedive Ismail in the 19th century to become the official government headquarters and royal residence, replacing the Citadel of Cairo used by rulers since the Middle Ages. Construction started in 1863 and continued for 10 years and the palace was officially inaugurated in 1874. The name means "Palace of the Nile" and refers to the name of the palace built by Said Pasha in 1858. The extensive gardens were completed in 1921 by Sultan Fuad I. The palace includes 500 rooms. Currently the upper floors (the former living quarters of the royal family) are reserved for visiting foreign dignitaries.  The palace structure is a national museums centre: with the Silver Museum, the Arms Museum, the Royal Family Museum, the Presidential Gifts Museum, and the Historical Documents Museum.
Sednaoui Department Store
The Sednaoui Department Store is a famous department store built in the 1920s by an Italian architect.  This building is a good example on the street of the unique blend of an elaborate Beaux-Arts style with Art Deco detailed decoration on the building's facade. The interior has a clear layout and style, and employed elevators in a store for the first time in Egypt. They provided the public easy access to many upper shopping floors, which are now is ubiquitous in megastores.
Royal Automobile Club
The Royal Automobile Club was built in the 1920s by an Italian architect but displays a different influence namely the Neo-Islamic style.  The architecture of this building is specifically of Fatimid influence, evident in the keel arches and sunburst motif on the façade.  This club was a popular social club in addition to being a popular night spot for the affluent in Egypt during the first half of the 20th century.
Bella Studio
Bella Studio is one of the oldest and most well known photographic studios in Egypt. Since it opened it has specialized in photo shoots for international socialites, Cairene celebrities, and Egyptian performers and actors.  The photography studio and gallery is located in the basement of a building which was designed in the Neo-Renaissance style, and built by a wealthy Italian developer living in Cairo into the 1950s.  The balconies are intricately detailed with artistic decoration, and its facades have colored stone mosaics with the owner's Italian name written in Kufi script.  The building was nationalized and is now owned by the Central Bank of Egypt, with only one elderly resident refusing to leave residence in Qasr el Nil Street.
Tahrir Square area
The Egyptian Antiquities Museum (Egyptian Museum) is north of the street on Tahrir Square. It was built as a museum in the early 20th century, being designed in the neoclassical architecture style with a distinctive light red color.  It was designed by French architect Marcel Dourgnon and built by the Italians Giuseppe Garozzo and Francesco Zaffarani.
The Mogamma, a Soviet era gift to Egypt, the immense government office building was completed in 1952.
The Headquarters of the Arab League headquarters building, a diplomatic enterprise.
Qasr El Nil Bridge
The Qasr El Nil Bridge, It has two very tall stone lion statues flanking each entrance, they are late 19th century works by French sculptor and animalier Henri Alfred Jacquemart.
Cairo Opera House
The National Cultural Centre, with the new Cairo Opera House, the Egyptian Modern Art Museum, and other arts venues on Gezira Island.

Present day
Qasr El Nil Street today is part of the vibrant culture of downtown Cairo. There are a lot of clothing and shoe stores in addition to banks and travel agencies.  "After 8" is a popular night club located on Qasr el Nil Street.  There is also an ice cream and sweets store called Groppi's that has been there since the turn of the century. The Qasr el Nil British Army Barracks were demolished in 1947 and replaced by an expanded Tahrir Square and the early 1950s modernist Nile Hilton Hotel complex.

In recent decades Qasr El Nil Street has become busier, and now there is insufficient parking for residents due to increasing commercial uses and number of 'nightlife venues' on the street especially, and in the neighborhood. A recent event here was the anti-Algerian riots that targeted an Algerian airline in the fallout of the events that took place during the World Cup qualification matches. The most recent street events are being a part of the 2011 Egyptian protest demonstrations for democracy, especially on the street's tw approaches to and section within Tahrir Square.

See also

Talaat Harb Street
Qasr El Ayni Street
Abdeen Palace Incident of 1942

References

External links 
 Center for Cultural Heritage Documentation.org: Architecture of Qasr El-Nil Street's buildings – images and info

Streets in Cairo
Downtown Cairo